John Koukouzelis (Ioannis Koukouzelis)  was a Byzantine composer, singer and reformer of Byzantine chant. He was recognized as a saint by the Eastern Orthodox Church after his death. Among the most illustrious musicians of the Palaiologos dynasty, his music remains held in high esteem by Albanians, Bulgarians, Greeks, Macedonians, Romanians and Serbs.

Life and career
Koukouzelis was born in Dyrrhachium (modern-day Durrës, Albania) in the late 13th century to a father of unknown origins (conjectured citation) and a Bulgarian mother. He was orphaned in childhood.

Koukouzelis' last name is allegedly derived either from the Greek word for broad beans (κουκιά, koukia) or the Albanian word for Red (Kuqe, arb. Cuccia) and a Slavic word for cabbage (зеле, zele).

At a young age, he was noted and accepted into the school at the imperial court at Constantinople, where he received his education and established himself as one of the leading authorities in his field during the time. A favourite of the Byzantine emperor and a principal choir chanter, he moved to Mount Athos and led a monastic way of life in the Great Lavra. Because of his singing abilities, he was called "Angel-voiced".

Musical style and compositions
Koukouzelis established a new melodious ("kalophonic") style of singing out of the sticherarion. Some years after the fall of Constantinople Manuel Chrysaphes characterised the sticheron kalophonikon and the anagrammatismos as new genres of psaltic art which were once created by John Koukouzelis.

Reception
In general it is useful to make a distinction between compositions which can be verified as the compositions by John Koukouzelis, and those which are simply based on the method which he taught (as a stylistic category based on the kalophonic melos as exemplified by Mega Ison). Even concerning famous compositions, their authorship is often a subject of scholarly debates whose concern is not always the talent of one individual composer—like the Polyeleoi of the Bulgarian Woman dedicated to his mother that, according to some researchers, contains elements of traditional Bulgarian mourning songs. Greek editions of the same Polyeleos are different and especially the authorship of the Kratema used in the Bulgarian edition has been a controversial issue. Concerning stichera kalophonika, there are numerous compositions made up in his name, but his authorship must be regarded as a certain school which had a lot of followers and imitators.

Sainthood and legacy
Koukouzelis is regarded as the most influential figure in the music of his period. He was later recognized as a saint by the Eastern Orthodox Church, his feast day being on 1 October.

A musical school in his native Durrës bears his name, Shkolla Jon Kukuzeli. Also, Kukuzel Cove in Livingston Island in the South Shetland Islands of Antarctica is named after Koukouzelis, using the Slavic form of his name.

References

Sources

Manuscripts

Print editions

Papadikai and their editions

.
.
.
.

Studies

External links

1280 births
1360 deaths
14th-century Byzantine people
14th-century Bulgarian people
14th-century Christian saints
Byzantine composers
Byzantine hymnographers
Byzantine saints of the Eastern Orthodox Church
Bulgarian classical composers
Composers of Christian music
Eastern Orthodox Christians from Albania
Medieval Bulgarian saints
14th-century composers
People from Durrës
Byzantine people of Slavic descent
Medieval male composers
14th-century Byzantine writers